Stamping Ground may refer to:

Stamping Ground (album), a 1994 album by Bill Bruford's Earthworks
Stamping Ground, a Pink Floyd bootleg release
The Stamping Ground, a 2001 album by Runrig
"Stamping Ground", a composition by Moondog
Stampin' Ground, a British heavy metal band
Stamping Ground (music festival)
Stamping Ground (dance festival), New South Wales, Australia
Stamping Ground (ballet), a 1983 contemporary dance
Stamping Ground, Kentucky, a town in the United States

See also
Stomping Ground, a 2000 album by Goldfinger
Stompin' Grounds, an album by The Kentucky Headhunters
Stompin' Ground
StompinGrounds
Stompen Ground